Nicholas Stuart Holmes-Smith (born 14 October 1958) is a Canadian equestrian. He competed at the 1988 Summer Olympics and the 1992 Summer Olympics.

References

External links
 

1958 births
Living people
Canadian male equestrians
Olympic equestrians of Canada
Equestrians at the 1988 Summer Olympics
Equestrians at the 1992 Summer Olympics
Pan American Games medalists in equestrian
Pan American Games gold medalists for Canada
Equestrians at the 1991 Pan American Games
Sportspeople from Penticton
Medalists at the 1991 Pan American Games
20th-century Canadian people
21st-century Canadian people